Temur Tsiklauri (22 January 1946 – 1 February 2021) was a Georgian pop singer and actor, member of the ensemble Iveria. Honored Artist of the Georgian SSR in 1980, People's Artist of Georgia in 1990 and Honorary Citizen of Tbilisi in 2010. He was a member of the band VIA Iveria.

Tsiklauri died in Gori on 1 February 2021, after contracting COVID-19 during the COVID-19 pandemic in Georgia, ten days after his 75th birthday.

References

External links
 Temur Tsiklauri at Biographical Dictionary of Georgia]
 
 

1946 births
2021 deaths
Deaths from the COVID-19 pandemic in Georgia (country)
People's Artists of Georgia
Honored Artists of the Georgian SSR
20th-century  male singers from Georgia (country)
21st-century  male singers from Georgia (country)